ONUKA (literally: granddaughter) is a Ukrainian electro-folk band. It was created in 2013 by Ukrainian musicians Yevhen Filatov and Nata Zhyzhchenko. Other group members are Daryna Sert (keyboardist and backing vocalist), Mariya Sorokina (percussionist) and Yevhen Yovenko (banduryst). The band's instrumentation includes electronic drums, trombones, French horns and Ukrainian folk instruments bandura and sopilka.

History 
The Ukrainian word Onuka translates to "granddaughter," a tribute to lead singer Zhyzhchenko's grandfather and renowned folk-instrument maker, Oleksandr Shlionchyk. Zhyzhchenko started her music career as a member of the band Tomato Jaws, a band that she started with her brother. Tomato Jaws remained active for 11 years. Several of its songs were remixed by Filatov's band The Maneken, ultimately leading to the creation of Onuka. Lead singer Nata Zhyzhchenko believes that she can revitalize old traditions and classic folk instruments (such as the bandura and sopilka), which disappeared in the Soviet times.

ONUKA's debut album was released on October 15, 2014, and it became the best-selling record of the month in iTunes Ukraine. Their first EP, Look, was released on May 15 and debuted at #1 in iTunes Ukraine.
ONUKA released a second EP, Vidlik on February 8, 2016. The EP includes five tracks: Svitanok, Vidlik, Other (Intro), Other, and 19 86. Zhyzhchenko cites the Chernobyl disaster and its impact on Ukraine as a major influence on the album. The EP's name, Vidlik, means a new beginning, or countdown.

In 2017, ONUKA was featured in an interval act at the 2017 Eurovision Song Contest, performing with the NAONI folk orchestra.

Discography

Studio albums

Live albums

EPs

Singles

Recognition 
Onuka was nominated for the Ukrainian Yuna Music Awards in the Discovery of the Year category.

References

External links

 
 

Ukrainian musical groups
Ukrainian electronic musicians
Musical groups established in 2013
English-language singers from Ukraine
2013 establishments in Ukraine